List of Afghan Rulers in present-day Afghanistan with capital at Peshawar     

History of Peshawar
Political history of Afghanistan
Peshawar
Afghanistan-related lists